Stelios Aposporis (born 15 November 1964) is a former Greek footballer who played as a midfielder. He played during the 80's in many famous Greek teams such as Panionios (1982–1990), OFI Crete (1990–1993) and Doxa Virona (1993–1996) and in 1996 decided to retire from professional football. In 2004, he was appointed from Hellenic Football Federation as Greece Under 21 manager. He was replaced in September 2007 by Nikos Nioplias.

References

External links
 Aposporis speaks about the Panionios team dramatic situation in November 2013

1964 births
Living people
Panionios F.C. players
OFI Crete F.C. players
Association football midfielders
Doxa Vyronas F.C. players
Footballers from Athens
Greek footballers